is a passenger railway station located in Kōhoku-ku, Yokohama, Kanagawa Prefecture, Japan, operated by the private railway company Tokyu Corporation. It is located in front of Myōrenji Buddhist temple after which it takes its name.

Lines

Station layout 
The station consists of two elevated opposed side platforms, with the station building underneath.

Platforms

History
It was renamed Myōrenji on January 1, 1931.

Passenger statistics
In fiscal 2019, the station was used by an average of 26,102 passengers daily. 

The passenger figures for previous years are as shown below.

Surrounding area
Myoren-ji Temple
 Myorenji Station Shopping Street 
Yokohama Myorenji Post Office
Yokohama City Kohoku Elementary School

See also
 List of railway stations in Japan

References

External links

 

Railway stations in Kanagawa Prefecture
Tokyu Toyoko Line
Stations of Tokyu Corporation
Railway stations in Yokohama
Railway stations in Japan opened in 1926